Here's to the Ladies is an album by Tony Bennett, released in 1995.

The theme of the album was songs made famous by female singers. The album won Bennett the Grammy Award for Best Traditional Pop Vocal Performance. It peaked at No. 1 on Billboard'''s Traditional Jazz Albums chart.

Critical receptionEntertainment Weekly'' wrote that Bennett's "sensitivity to the distaff side of prerock music balances the craggy muscularity of his vocal style."

Track listing
"People" (Bob Merrill, Jule Styne) 4:44 - Barbra Streisand tribute
"I'm in Love Again" (Peggy Lee, Cy Coleman) 3:52 - Peggy Lee tribute
"Over the Rainbow" (Harold Arlen, Yip Harburg) 3:59 - Judy Garland tribute
"My Love Went to London" (T. Seibetta, John Wallowitch) 5:11 - Blossom Dearie tribute
"Poor Butterfly" (John Golden, Raymond Hubbell) 5:43 - Sarah Vaughan tribute
"Sentimental Journey" (Les Brown, Bud Green, Ben Homer) 3:29 - Doris Day tribute
"Cloudy Morning" (Marvin Fisher, Joseph Allan McCarthy) 4:44 - Carmen McRae tribute
"Tenderly" (Walter Gross, Jack Lawrence) 3:47 - Rosemary Clooney tribute
"Down in the Depths (On the Ninetieth Floor)" (Cole Porter) 2:11 - Mabel Mercer tribute
"Moonlight in Vermont" (John Blackburn, Karl Suessdorf) 2:53 - Margaret Whiting tribute
"Tangerine" (Johnny Mercer, Victor Schertzinger) 4:06 - Helen O'Connell tribute
"God Bless the Child" (Arthur Herzog Jr., Billie Holiday) 2:51 - Billie Holiday tribute
"Daybreak" (Harold Adamson, Ferde Grofé) 3:45 - Dinah Washington tribute
"You Showed Me the Way" (Ella Fitzgerald, Green, Teddy McRae, Chick Webb) 5:31 - Ella Fitzgerald tribute
"Honeysuckle Rose" (Andy Razaf, Fats Waller) 2:57 - Lena Horne tribute
"Maybe This Time" (Fred Ebb, John Kander) 3:26 - Liza Minnelli tribute
"I Got Rhythm" (George Gershwin, Ira Gershwin) 2:01 - Ethel Merman tribute
"My Ideal" (Newell Chase, Leo Robin, Richard Whiting) 1:55 - Margaret Whiting tribute

Personnel
 Tony Bennett - vocals
 Ralph Sharon - piano
 Clayton Cameron - drums
 Doug Richeson - double bass
 Lew Soloff - trumpet solos
 unidentified session orchestra and big band (except for tracks 8, 10, 12, 16, 17 & 18)
 Jorge Calandrelli - arranger, conductor of the orchestral charts (tracks 2, 4-7, 13-15)
 Bill Holman - arranger, conductor of the Big Band charts (tracks 1, 3, 9, 11)

References

1995 albums
Tony Bennett albums
Columbia Records albums
Albums produced by David Kahne
Covers albums
Grammy Award for Best Traditional Pop Vocal Album